Boundary Butte is a 4,934-foot (1,504 meter) elevation sandstone summit located south of Lake Powell, in extreme southwestern San Juan County, Utah, United States, just north of the Arizona border. It lies on the 
Utah-Arizona border, hence its name.

Geology
Boundary Butte is a butte composed primarily of Entrada Sandstone, similar to Dominguez Butte  to the north, and Tower Butte  to the southwest. The Entrada Sandstone overlays Carmel Formation, and below that Page Sandstone at lake level. Above the Entrada layers is Romana Sandstone capped by Morrison Formation. It is located in the southern edge of the Great Basin Desert on the Colorado Plateau. Precipitation runoff from this feature drains into the Colorado River watershed.

Gallery

Climate
According to the Köppen climate classification system, Boundary Butte is located in an arid climate zone with hot, very dry summers, and chilly winters with very little snow. Spring and fall are the most favorable seasons to visit.

See also
 Colorado Plateau
 List of rock formations in the United States

References

External links

 Weather forecast: National Weather Service

Colorado Plateau
Landforms of San Juan County, Utah
Geography of the Navajo Nation
Lake Powell
Buttes of Utah
North American 1000 m summits
Sandstone formations of the United States